The 2004–05 All-Ireland Junior Club Football Championship was the fourth staging of the All-Ireland Junior Club Football Championship since its establishment by the Gaelic Athletic Association.

The All-Ireland final was played on 28 March 2005 at O'Moore Park in Portlaoise, between Finuge and Stewartstown Harps. Finuge won the match by 1-14 to 0-06 to claim their first ever championship title.

All-Ireland Junior Club Football Championship

All-Ireland final

References

2004 in Irish sport
2005 in Irish sport
All-Ireland Junior Club Football Championship
All-Ireland Junior Club Football Championship